Xu Hong Yan is a paralympic athlete from China competing mainly in category F12 shot put and discus events.

She competed in three consecutive paralympics games, winning medals each time.  She first appeared in 1996 Summer Paralympics where she made her only appearance in the javelin and won a silver in the Discus and gold in the shot put.  The following games in Sydney in 2000 Summer Paralympics Hong Yan reversed her medals winning the gold medal in the discus and silver in the shot put.  This was a performance she repeated in her last games in 2004 Summer Paralympics where she again won silver in the shot and gold in the discus.

References

External links
 

Paralympic athletes of China
Athletes (track and field) at the 1996 Summer Paralympics
Athletes (track and field) at the 2000 Summer Paralympics
Athletes (track and field) at the 2004 Summer Paralympics
Paralympic gold medalists for China
Paralympic silver medalists for China
Chinese female shot putters
Chinese female discus throwers
Chinese female javelin throwers
Living people
Medalists at the 1996 Summer Paralympics
Medalists at the 2000 Summer Paralympics
Medalists at the 2004 Summer Paralympics
Year of birth missing (living people)
Paralympic medalists in athletics (track and field)
21st-century Chinese women